Aziz District is a district of Médéa Province, Algeria.

The district is further divided into 3 municipalities:
Aziz
Oum El Djalil
Derrag

Districts of Médéa Province